Andeancistrus platycephalus is a species of catfish in the family Loricariidae. It is native to South America, where it occurs in the Zamora River basin, which is part of the upper Marañon River drainage in Ecuador. The species reaches 14.5 cm (5.7 inches) in total length. The species was known as Cordylancistrus platycephalus until a 2015 reclassification, when Nathan K. Lujan, Vanessa Meza-Vargas, and Ramiro Barriga-Salazar constructed the genera Andeancistrus and Transancistrus.

References 

Loricariidae
Fish described in 1898
Catfish of South America